This is a list of technology podcasts.

List

References 

Lists of podcasts
Infotainment

Technology-related lists